Kavana may refer to:
 Kavana, Kannada poetry
 Kavana Cooperative, a nondenominational Jewish organization in Seattle, Washington
 Kavana (Judaism) or Kavanah, the intention to perform a mitzva
 Kafana or kavana, a type of coffeeshop in some South Slavic areas
 Kavana (Hadgaon), a village in Hadgaon taluka India.

People with the name
 Kavana (singer), British singer
 Kavana (album), an album by Kavana
 Kavana Sarma, Indian professor and Telugu fiction writer
 Ron Kavana, Irish singer

See also
 Flex Kavana, former ring name of former wrestler Dwayne Johnson
 Kavana Kaumudi, a journal of Sanskrit poetry published by Pandalam Kerala Varma
 Kavana Gella, a work by Andayya